Skornyakov, Skorniakov (Russian and Ukrainian: Скорняков) is a Russian-language occupational surname, a patronymic derivation from the occupation of skornyak, furrier.

Aleksei Skornyakov
Eduard Skornyakov
Roman Skorniakov

See also
 

Russian-language surnames
Ukrainian-language surnames
Occupational surnames